Court Martial is a 1928 American silent film war drama film directed by George B. Seitz, starring Jack Holt, Betty Compson as Belle Starr, and Frank Austin as Abraham Lincoln, and released by Columbia Pictures.

A foreign release print of the film survives and is preserved in the collection of the Museum of Modern Art in New York. It was shown at the annual Cinecon Classic Film Festival in 2014.

Publicity for the film stated that several sequences were shot in early Technicolor, but these do not appear to have survived.

Cast
Jack Holt as James Camden
Betty Compson as Belle Starr
Pat Harmon as  Bull
Doris Hill as General's Daughter
Frank Lackteen as 'Devil' Dawson
Frank Austin as President Abraham Lincoln
George Cowl as General Robert Hackathorne
Zack Williams as Negro

Preservation status
Prints held at National Archives of Canada, Cineteca del Friuli (Gemona), Museum of Modern Art (MOMA), and 16mm at Library of Congress.

References

External links
 
 

American black-and-white films
American Civil War films
American silent feature films
Columbia Pictures films
Cultural depictions of Belle Starr
Depictions of Abraham Lincoln on film
Films directed by George B. Seitz
Military courtroom films
Silent films in color
1920s color films
1928 drama films
1928 films
1920s American films
Silent American drama films